Breaza de Sus may refer to several villages in Romania:

 Breaza de Sus, a district in the town of Breaza, Prahova County
 Breaza de Sus, a village in the commune of Breaza, Suceava